The year 2001 in film involved some significant events, including the first installments of the Harry Potter, Fast & Furious, Spy Kids, Monsters, Inc. and Shrek franchises, and The Lord of the Rings and Ocean's trilogies. Significant non-English language films released included Monsoon Wedding, Amélie and Spirited Away. There was one film, Harry Potter and the Philosopher's Stone, that passed over $1 billion in a re-release of 2020.

The inaugural entries of the Harry Potter and Lord of the Rings film franchises prompted a shift in both the film and literary communities by propelling fantasy into mainstream culture, popularizing young adult novels, and reforming the blockbuster to promote film franchises and cater to fandom communities.

Highest-grossing films

The top 10 films released in 2001 by worldwide gross are as follows:

Harry Potter and the Philosopher's Stone grossed $974 million, and became the second highest-grossing film of all time. It was also the highest-grossing film in the Harry Potter film franchise before Harry Potter and the Deathly Hallows – Part 2 surpassed it in 2011.

2001 was the first time that two films released in the same year grossed more than $800 million at the box office, with Harry Potter and the Philosopher's Stone and The Lord of the Rings: The Fellowship of the Ring surpassing the milestone.

The highest-grossing non-English film was Studio Ghibli's anime Spirited Away, which was the 15th highest-grossing film of the year.

Events
 May 18 – Shrek was released to critical acclaim and went on to win the inaugural Best Animated Feature Film Oscar the following year.
 June 22 – The Fast and the Furious is released, launching one of the highest-grossing franchises in film history.
 August 8 – Actors Tom Cruise and Nicole Kidman divorce.
 November 2 – Monsters, Inc. opens with the best ticket sales ever for an animated film and the 6th-best of all time.
 November 16 and December 19 – The beginning of two acclaimed fantasy film series based on best-selling novels: Harry Potter and The Lord of the Rings, respectively.

Award ceremonies
 6th Empire Awards

Awards

2001 Wide-release films

January–March

April–June

July–September

October–December

Notable films released in 2001
United States unless stated

#
 12 Hours (12 Horas) - (Puerto Rico)
 15 Minutes, starring Robert De Niro, Edward Burns and Kelsey Grammer
 3000 Miles to Graceland, starring Kurt Russell, Kevin Costner, David Arquette and Courteney Cox
 The 51st State, starring Samuel L. Jackson, Robert Carlyle and Emily Mortimer - (UK)
 61*, directed by Billy Crystal, starring Barry Pepper and Thomas Jane

A
 A.I. Artificial Intelligence, directed by Steven Spielberg, starring Haley Joel Osment, William Hurt, Frances O'Connor, Jude Law and Brendan Gleeson
 Absolute 100 (Apsolutnih sto) – (Yugoslavia)
 Address Unknown – (South Korea)
 The Affair of the Necklace, starring Hilary Swank
 Ali, directed by Michael Mann, starring Will Smith, Jamie Foxx, Jon Voight, Mario Van Peebles and Ron Silver
 All About Lily Chou-Chou (Rirī Shushu no Subete) – (Japan)
 All Over the Guy
 Along Came a Spider, directed by Lee Tamahori, starring Morgan Freeman and Monica Potter
 The Amati Girls, starring Cloris Leachman, Mercedes Ruehl and Sean Young
 Amélie (a.k.a. Le Fabuleux Destin d'Amélie Poulain), directed by Jean-Pierre Jeunet, starring Audrey Tautou and Mathieu Kassovitz – (France)
 The American Astronaut
 American Outlaws, starring Colin Farrell, Scott Caan and Ali Larter
 American Pie 2, starring Jason Biggs, Seann William Scott, Chris Klein, Shannon Elizabeth and Eugene Levy
 America's Sweethearts, starring Julia Roberts, John Cusack, Billy Crystal and Catherine Zeta-Jones
 Amy's Orgasm
 Angel Eyes, starring Jennifer Lopez and Jim Caviezel
 Animal (Animalada) – (Argentina)
 The Animal, starring Rob Schneider and John C. McGinley
 The Anniversary Party, directed by and starring Jennifer Jason Leigh and Alan Cumming, with Kevin Kline and Phoebe Cates
 Another Life, starring Ioan Gruffudd, Imelda Staunton and Tom Wilkinson – (UK)
 Antitrust, starring Ryan Phillippe and Claire Forlani
 As Far as My Feet Will Carry Me (So weit die Füße tragen) – (Germany)
 Aśoka – (India)
 Atanarjuat: The Fast Runner – (Canada)
 Atlantis: The Lost Empire, with the voices of Michael J. Fox and John Mahoney
 Avalon – (Japan)
 Ayyam El Sadat (The Days of Sadat) – (Egypt)

B
 Baby Boy, directed by John Singleton
 Bandits, directed by Barry Levinson, starring Bruce Willis, Billy Bob Thornton and Cate Blanchett
 The Bank, starring David Wenham and Anthony LaPaglia – (Australia)
 Baran (Rain) – (Iran)
 A Beautiful Mind, directed by Ron Howard, starring Russell Crowe, Jennifer Connelly, Paul Bettany, Adam Goldberg and Ed Harris
 Behind Enemy Lines, starring Owen Wilson and Gene Hackman
 Behind the Sun (Abril Despedaçado) – (Brazil)
 Beijing Bicycle (Shí qī suì de dān chē) – (China)
 Beijing Rocks (Bak Ging lok yue liu) – (Hong Kong)
 Berlin Babylon – (Germany)
 The Believer, starring Ryan Gosling
 Big Bad Love, directed by and starring Arliss Howard, with Debra Winger, Rosanna Arquette and Angie Dickinson
 Big Man, Little Love (Büyük Adam Küçük Aşk) – (Turkey)
 Bintou – (Burkina Faso)
 Birthday Girl, starring Nicole Kidman and Ben Chaplin – (UK)
 Black Chicks Talking – (Australia)
 Black Hawk Down, directed by Ridley Scott, starring Eric Bana, Ewan McGregor, Josh Hartnett, Tom Sizemore and Sam Shepard
 Black Knight, starring Martin Lawrence
 Blow, directed by Ted Demme, starring Johnny Depp, Penélope Cruz, Ray Liotta, Rachel Griffiths, Paul Reubens
 Bolivia – (Argentina/Netherlands)
 A Boy Named Sue
 Brainstorm (Bicho de Sete Cabeças) – (Brazil)
 Bread and Milk (Kruh in mleko) – (Slovenia)
 Bridget Jones's Diary, starring Renée Zellweger, Hugh Grant, Colin Firth and Jim Broadbent – (UK)
 Brotherhood of the Wolf (Le Pacte des loups), starring Vincent Cassel – (France)
 The Brothers, starring Morris Chestnut and D. L. Hughley
 Bubble Boy, starring Jake Gyllenhaal
 Buffalo Soldiers, starring Joaquin Phoenix, Anna Paquin, Ed Harris, Idris Elba and Elizabeth McGovern
 Bully, starring Brad Renfro
 Bungee Jumping of Their Own (Beonjijeompeureul hada) – (South Korea)
 The Bunker, starring Jason Flemyng – (UK)

C
 CQ, directed by Roman Coppola, starring Jeremy Davies, Jason Schwartzman, Giancarlo Giannini and Gérard Depardieu
 A Cab for Three (Taxi para tres) – (Chile)
 Captain Corelli's Mandolin, directed by John Madden starring Nicolas Cage, Christian Bale, John Hurt and Penélope Cruz – (UK/US/France)
 Carving Out Our Name
 The Cat's Meow, directed by Peter Bogdanovich, starring Kirsten Dunst, Cary Elwes, Eddie Izzard, Edward Herrmann and Joanna Lumley – (UK/US/Germany)
 Cats & Dogs, starring Jeff Goldblum and Elizabeth Perkins with the voices of Tobey Maguire, Alec Baldwin and Charlton Heston – (US/Australia)
 The Center of the World, starring Peter Sarsgaard and Molly Parker
 Chandni Bar, starring Tabu – (India)
 Chaos – (France)
 Charlotte Gray, directed by Gillian Armstrong, starring Cate Blanchett – (UK/Australia/Germany)
A Chronicle of Corpses, directed by Andrew Repasky McElhinney, starring Marj Dusay, Oliver Wyman, Margot White, Ryan Foley, Kevin Mitchell Martin, David Semonin, (USA)
 La Ciénaga (The Swamp) – (Argentina/Spain/France)
 The Closet (Le Placard), starring Daniel Auteuil and Gérard Depardieu – (France)
 The Code – (Finland)
 Come Look at Me (Prikhodi Na Menya Posmotret) – (Russia)
 Crazy/Beautiful, starring Kirsten Dunst and Jay Hernandez
 Crocodile Dundee in Los Angeles, starring Paul Hogan – (Australia/US)
 Crush, starring Andie MacDowell – (UK)
 Crying... Silicon Tears (To Klama vgike apo ton paradeiso) – (Greece)
 The Curse of the Jade Scorpion, directed by and starring Woody Allen, with Helen Hunt, Charlize Theron, Wallace Shawn and Dan Aykroyd

D
 Dark Blue World (Tmavomodrý svět) – (Czech Republic)
 Darpan Chaya (दर्पण छायाँ) – (Napal)
 The Days of Sadat, directed by Mohamed Khan, starring Ahmed Zaki, Mervat Amin and Mona Zaki – (Egypt)
 Delivering Milo, starring Anton Yelchin and Albert Finney
 Den – (US/Australia)
 The Devil's Backbone (El espinazo del diablo), directed by Guillermo del Toro – (Spain/Mexico)
 Dil Chahta Hai (The Heart Desires) – (India)
 Disco Pigs, starring Cillian Murphy – (Ireland)
 Distance – (Japan)
 Dog Days (Hundstage) – (Austria)
 Dogtown and Z-Boys
 Domestic Disturbance, starring John Travolta, Vince Vaughn and Steve Buscemi
 Don't Say a Word, starring Michael Douglas, Brittany Murphy and Sean Bean
 Donnie Darko, directed by Richard Kelly, starring Jake Gyllenhaal, Maggie Gyllenhaal, Drew Barrymore, Mary McDonnell and Patrick Swayze
 Down House (Даун Хаус) – (Russia)
 Down to Earth, directed by Chris and Paul Weitz, starring Chris Rock
 Dr. Dolittle 2, starring Eddie Murphy and Raven-Symoné
 Driven, directed by Renny Harlin, starring Sylvester Stallone, Kip Pardue, Estella Warren, Burt Reynolds

E
 Earth vs. the Spider, starring Dan Aykroyd and Theresa Russell
 Edges of the Lord (Boze skrawki), starring Haley Joel Osment and Willem Dafoe – (Poland/US)
 Elephants and Grass (Filler ve Çimen) – (Turkey)
 Elling – (Norway)
 Elsewhere – (Austria)
 Elvira's Haunted Hills, starring Cassandra Peterson
 The Emperor's New Clothes, starring Ian Holm – (Italy/Ger/UK)
 Enemy at the Gates, directed by Jean-Jacques Annaud, starring Ed Harris, Rachel Weisz, Jude Law and Bob Hoskins – (Fr/US/Ger/UK/Ire)
 Enigma, directed by Michael Apted, starring Kate Winslet, Dougray Scott, Jeremy Northam and Saffron Burrows – (UK)
 Evolution, directed by Ivan Reitman, starring David Duchovny, Orlando Jones, Julianne Moore and Dan Aykroyd
 Exit Wounds, starring Steven Seagal and DMX
 The Experiment (Das Experiment) – (Germany)

F
 Failan – (South Korea)
 The Fast and the Furious, directed by Rob Cohen, starring Paul Walker and Vin Diesel
 Fat Girl (À ma sœur!) – (France)
 Fate (Yazgi) – (Turkey)
 Festival in Cannes, directed by Henry Jaglom, starring Anouk Aimée, Greta Scacchi, Maximilian Schell
 La Fiebre del Loco (Abalone Fever) – (Chile)
 Final Fantasy: The Spirits Within, with the voices of Ming-Na Wen and Alec Baldwin – (US/Japan)
 Finder's Fee, starring Erik Palladino, Ryan Reynolds, Robert Forster and James Earl Jones
 Fish and Elephant (Jin nian xia tian), directed by Li Yu – (China)
 Flower Island (Ggot Seom) – (South Korea)
 The Forsaken
 The Fourth Angel, starring Jeremy Irons and Forest Whitaker – (UK/Canada)
 Frailty, directed by and starring Bill Paxton, with Matthew McConaughey and Powers Boothe
 Freddy Got Fingered, directed by and starring Tom Green, with Rip Torn
 Freedom (La Libertad) – (Argentina)
 Friend (Chin-gu) – (South Korea)
 From Hell, directed by the Hughes brothers, starring Johnny Depp, Heather Graham and Robbie Coltrane
 La Fuga (The Escape) – (Argentina)
 Full Disclosure, starring Fred Ward, Penelope Ann Miller, Rachel Ticotin, Christopher Plummer, Kim Coates, Virginia Madsen
 Fulltime Killer (Quanzhi Shashou), starring Andy Lau – (Hong Kong)

G
 Gadar: Ek Prem Katha (Traitor: A Love Story), starring Sunny Deol – (India)
 Gasoline (Benzina) – (Italy)
 Get a Life (Ganhar a Vida) – (Portugal)
 Get Over It, starring Kirsten Dunst, Shane West, Ben Foster and Colin Hanks
 Ghost World, directed by Terry Zwigoff, starring Steve Buscemi, Thora Birch and Scarlett Johansson
 Ghosts of Mars, directed by John Carpenter, starring Ice Cube, Jason Statham, Pam Grier and Natasha Henstridge
 The Glass House, starring Leelee Sobieski, Diane Lane, Kathy Baker and Bruce Dern
 Go – (Japan)
 Godzilla, Mothra and King Ghidorah: Giant Monsters All-Out Attack – (Japan)
 Gosford Park, directed by Robert Altman, starring Helen Mirren, Michael Gambon, Bob Balaban, Kristin Scott Thomas, Clive Owen, Ryan Phillippe, Kelly Macdonald, Maggie Smith and Alan Bates – (UK/US)
 The Grey Zone, directed by Tim Blake Nelson, starring David Arquette, Steve Buscemi, Harvey Keitel and Daniel Benzali

H
 Habaneceres, directed by Luis Leonel León
 Halloweentown II: Kalabar's Revenge
 Hannibal, directed by Ridley Scott, starring Anthony Hopkins, Julianne Moore, Gary Oldman, Ray Liotta and Giancarlo Giannini
 The Happiness of the Katakuris (takuri-ke no kōfuku), directed by Takashi Miike – (Japan)
 Hardball, starring Keanu Reeves and D. B. Sweeney
 Harrison's Flowers, starring Andie MacDowell and Elias Koteas – (France)
 Harry Potter and the Philosopher's Stone, aka Harry Potter and the Sorcerer's Stone, directed by Chris Columbus, starring Daniel Radcliffe, Rupert Grint, Emma Watson, Robbie Coltrane, Richard Harris, Alan Rickman and Maggie Smith – (UK/US)
 Harvard Man, starring Adrian Grenier, Sarah Michelle Gellar and Joey Lauren Adams
 He Died with a Felafel in His Hand – (Australia)
 Head over Heels, starring Monica Potter and Freddie Prinze, Jr.
 Heartbreakers, starring Sigourney Weaver, Jennifer Love Hewitt, Jason Lee, Ray Liotta and Gene Hackman
 Hearts in Atlantis, starring Anthony Hopkins, Anton Yelchin and Hope Davis
 Hedwig and the Angry Inch
 Heist, directed by David Mamet, starring Gene Hackman, Danny DeVito, Delroy Lindo, Rebecca Pidgeon, Sam Rockwell and Ricky Jay
 Her Majesty – (New Zealand)
 Herkes Kendi Evinde (Away from Home) – (Turkey)
 Herman U. S. A.
 Une hirondelle a fait le printemps (a.k.a. The Girl from Paris) – (France)
 Hotel, directed by Mike Figgis, starring Saffron Burrows – (UK/Italy)
 How High, starring Method Man and Redman
 How I Killed My Father (Comment j'ai tué mon père) – (France)
 Human Nature, directed by Michel Gondry, starring Tim Robbins, Rhys Ifans, Patricia Arquette and Miranda Otto

I
 I Am Sam, starring Sean Penn, Michelle Pfeiffer, Dakota Fanning and Laura Dern
 I Wish I Had a Wife (Nado anaega isseosseumyeon johgessda) – (South Korea)
 Ichi the Killer (Koroshiya 1), directed by Takashi Miike – (Japan)
 The Ignorant Fairies (Le fate ignoranti) – (Italy)
 I'm Going Home (Je rentre à la maison), starring Michel Piccoli and Catherine Deneuve – (France/Portugal)
 In the Bedroom, directed by Todd Field, starring Tom Wilkinson, Sissy Spacek, Nick Stahl and Marisa Tomei
 In Vanda's Room (No Quarto da Vanda) – (Portugal)
 Intacto – (Spain)
 Intimacy – (Fr/UK/Ger/Sp) – Golden Bear award
 Inuyasha the Movie: Affections Touching Across Time (Inuyasha – Jidai wo koeru omoi) – (Japan)
 Iris, starring Judi Dench, Kate Winslet and Jim Broadbent – (UK)

J
 Jan Dara (จัน ดารา) – (Thailand)
 Jay and Silent Bob Strike Back, directed by and starring Kevin Smith, with Jason Mewes, Ben Affleck, Will Ferrell and Shannon Elizabeth
 Jeepers Creepers, starring Justin Long
 Jimmy Neutron: Boy Genius
 The Jimmy Show, starring Frank Whaley, Carla Gugino and Ethan Hawke
 Joe Dirt, starring David Spade
 Joe Somebody, starring Tim Allen
 Josie and the Pussycats, starring Rosario Dawson, Rachael Leigh Cook and Tara Reid
 Joy Ride, starring Paul Walker and Steve Zahn
 July Rhapsody (Laam yan sei sap), starring Jacky Cheung – (Hong Kong)
 Jurassic Park III, directed by Joe Johnston, starring Sam Neill, William H. Macy, Téa Leoni and Michael Jeter
 Just Visiting, starring Jean Reno and Christina Applegate – (US/France)

K
 K-PAX, starring Jeff Bridges and Kevin Spacey
 Kabhi Khushi Kabhie Gham... (Sometimes there's happiness, sometimes there's sadness) – (India)
 Kairo (Pulse), directed by Kiyoshi Kurosawa – (Japan)
 Kandahar (Safar-e Ghandehar) – (Iran)
 Kate & Leopold, directed by James Mangold, starring Meg Ryan and Hugh Jackman
 Kick the Moon (Shinlaui dalbam) – (South Korea)
 Kill Me Later, starring Selma Blair and Max Beesley
 Kingdom Come, starring LL Cool J and Jada Pinkett Smith
 Kira's Reason: A Love Story (En Kærlighedshistoriefilm) – (Denmark)
 Kiss of the Dragon, starring Jet Li and Bridget Fonda – (US/France)
 Kissing Jessica Stein, starring Heather Juergensen and Jennifer Westfeldt
 A Knight's Tale, directed by Brian Helgeland, starring Heath Ledger, Shannyn Sossamon, Rufus Sewell and Paul Bettany

L
 L.I.E., starring Brian Cox
 Lagaan (Land Tax) – (India)
 Lajja, starring Manisha Koirala and Jackie Shroff – (India)
 Lan Yu (藍宇), directed by Stanley Kwan – (Hong Kong/China)
 Lantana, starring Anthony LaPaglia and Geoffrey Rush – (Australia)
 Lara Croft: Tomb Raider, directed by Simon West, starring Angelina Jolie, Jon Voight and Daniel Craig
 The Last Castle, directed by Rod Lurie, starring Robert Redford, Mark Ruffalo and James Gandolfini
 The Last Kiss (L'ultimo bacio) – (Italy)
 Last Orders, starring Bob Hoskins, Michael Caine, Ray Winstone and Helen Mirren – (UK)
 Last Present (Seon Mul) – (South Korea)
 Last Wedding – (Canada)
 Late Marriage (Hatuna Meuheret) – (Israel)
 Late Night Shopping – (UK)
 Legally Blonde, starring Reese Witherspoon, Luke Wilson, Jennifer Coolidge, Selma Blair and Ali Larter
 The Legend of Suriyothai – (Thailand)
 L'Emploi du Temps (Time Out) – (France)
 Letter to America (Pismo do Amerika) – (Bulgaria)
 Life as a House, starring Kevin Kline and Kristin Scott Thomas
 Lijmen/Het Been – (Belgium/Netherlands)
 Lloyd
 The Lord of the Rings: The Fellowship of the Ring, directed by Peter Jackson, starring Elijah Wood, Ian McKellen, Viggo Mortensen, Orlando Bloom, Liv Tyler, Sean Bean, Hugo Weaving and Cate Blanchett – (New Zealand/US)
 Lost and Delirious – (Canada)
 Lovely & Amazing, starring Catherine Keener, Jake Gyllenhaal and Emily Mortimer
 Lucía y el sexo (Sex and Lucia), starring Paz Vega – (Spain)
 The Luzhin Defence, starring John Turturro and Emily Watson – (UK/France)
 Lyle the Kindly Viking

M
 Maangamizi: The Ancient One – (Tanzania/US)
 Mad Love (Juana la Loco) – (Spain)
 The Majestic, directed by Frank Darabont, starring Jim Carrey, Martin Landau, Jeffrey DeMunn, Laurie Holden, Hal Holbrook, and Bob Balaban
 Man Walking on Snow (Aruku, hito), starring Ken Ogata – (Japan)
 The Man Who Sued God, starring Billy Connolly – (Australia)
 The Man Who Wasn't There, directed by the Coen brothers, starring Billy Bob Thornton, Frances McDormand, James Gandolfini, Scarlett Johansson and Tony Shalhoub
 Max Keeble's Big Move, starring Alex D. Linz
 Me Without You, starring Anna Friel and Kyle MacLachlan – (UK)
 Mean Machine, starring Vinnie Jones and Jason Statham – (UK)
 Megiddo: The Omega Code 2, starring Michael York and Michael Biehn
 Metropolis (メトロポリス) – (Japan)
 The Mexican, directed by Gore Verbinski, starring Brad Pitt, Julia Roberts and James Gandolfini
 Mike Bassett: England Manager, starring Ricky Tomlinson – (UK)
 Millennium Actress (Sennen Joyū) – (Japan)
 Millennium Mambo (Qiānxī Mànbō) – (Taiwan)
 Mind Meld
 Mind Rage, directed by Mark Allen Michaels, starring Charles Hallahan, Michael Rogue, Dennis Christopher and Tippi Hedren
 Mockingbird Don't Sing
 Monkeybone, directed by Henry Selick, starring Brendan Fraser, Bridget Fonda and Whoopi Goldberg with the voice of John Turturro
 Monrak Transistor (aka Transistor Love Story) – (Thailand)
 Monsoon Wedding, directed by Mira Nair – (US/India)
 Monster's Ball, directed by Marc Forster, starring Halle Berry, Billy Bob Thornton, Heath Ledger and Peter Boyle
 Monsters, Inc., directed by Pete Docter, with voices of John Goodman, Billy Crystal, Steve Buscemi and James Coburn
 Moscow Square (Moszkva tér) – (Hungary)
 Moulin Rouge!, directed by Baz Luhrmann, starring Nicole Kidman, Ewan McGregor, John Leguizamo and Jim Broadbent – (Australia/US)
 The Moving True Story of a Woman Ahead of Her Time (aka Nynka) – (Netherlands)
 Mulholland Drive, directed by David Lynch, starring Naomi Watts, Laura Harring and Justin Theroux
 The Mummy Returns, directed by Stephen Sommers, starring Brendan Fraser, Rachel Weisz, John Hannah, Arnold Vosloo and Dwayne "The Rock" Johnson.
 My First Mister, directed by Christine Lahti, starring Leelee Sobieski and Albert Brooks
 My Sassy Girl (Yeopgijeogin geunyeo) – (South Korea)

N
 Nabi (Butterfly) – (South Korea)
 Nandha – (India)
 Nayak: The Real Hero, starring Anil Kapoor – (India)
 No Man's Land (Ničija zemlja) – (Bosnia-Herzegovina/France/Italy/UK)
 Not Another Teen Movie, starring Chris Evans
 The Notice of the Day (Arregui, La Noticia del Día) – (Argentina)
 Nowhere in Africa (Nirgendwo in Afrika) – (Germany)
 The Navigators, directed by Ken Loach - (UK)

O
 O, directed by Tim Blake Nelson, starring Mekhi Phifer, Josh Hartnett, Julia Stiles and Martin Sheen
 Ocean's Eleven, directed by Steven Soderbergh, starring George Clooney, Brad Pitt, Matt Damon, Don Cheadle, Andy García, Julia Roberts, Casey Affleck and Elliott Gould
 The Officers' Ward (La chambre des officiers) – (France)
 On the Green Carpet – (North Korea)
 The One, starring Jet Li, Delroy Lindo, Carla Gugino and Jason Statham
 One Fine Spring Day (Bomnaleun Ganda) – (South Korea)
 One Night at McCool's, starring Liv Tyler, Matt Dillon, Paul Reiser, Michael Douglas and John Goodman
 Original Sin, starring Angelina Jolie and Antonio Banderas
 The Orphan of Anyang (Anyangde guer) – (China)
 Osmosis Jones, starring Bill Murray and Molly Shannon with the voices of Chris Rock and David Hyde Pierce
 The Others, directed by Alejandro Amenábar, starring Nicole Kidman – (US/Spain)
 Out Cold

P–Q
 The Parole Officer, starring Steve Coogan and Lena Headey – (UK)
 Pau and His Brother (Pau i el seu germà) – (Spain/France)
 Pearl Harbor, directed by Michael Bay, starring Ben Affleck, Kate Beckinsale, Josh Hartnett, Cuba Gooding, Jr., Tom Sizemore, Jon Voight, and Alec Baldwin
 Perfume, starring Estella Warren, Jeff Goldblum and Mariel Hemingway
 Le Peuple Migrateur (Winged Migration) – (Fr/It/Ger/Sp/Swi/US)
 The Piano Teacher (La Pianiste), directed by Michael Haneke, starring Isabelle Huppert – (France/Austria)
 Piñero, starring Benjamin Bratt
 Planet of the Apes, directed by Tim Burton, starring Mark Wahlberg, Helena Bonham Carter, Tim Roth, Estella Warren and Michael Clarke Duncan
 The Pledge, directed by Sean Penn, starring Jack Nicholson, Aaron Eckhart, Helen Mirren, Robin Wright, Vanessa Redgrave, Mickey Rourke and Benicio del Toro.
 Princesa – (Italy/Spain)
 The Princess Diaries, directed by Garry Marshall, starring Anne Hathaway and Julie Andrews
 The Profession of Arms (Il mestiere delle armi), directed by Ermanno Olmi – (Italy)
 Pulse (Kairo) – (Japan)
 Purple Sunset (Ziri) – (China)
 Quitting (Zuotian) – (China)

R
 Rain – (New Zealand)
 Rat Race, starring Breckin Meyer, Seth Green, Cuba Gooding, Jr., John Cleese, Whoopi Goldberg, Amy Smart and Rowan Atkinson
 Recess: School's Out
 Revolution OS
 Riding in Cars with Boys, directed by Penny Marshall, starring Drew Barrymore, Steve Zahn, Brittany Murphy and James Woods
 The River (Joki) – (Finland)
 Roberto Succo – (France)
 Rock Star, starring Mark Wahlberg and Jennifer Aniston
 The Royal Tenenbaums, directed by Wes Anderson, starring Gene Hackman, Ben Stiller, Owen Wilson, Luke Wilson, Gwyneth Paltrow, Danny Glover, Anjelica Huston and Bill Murray
 Rush Hour 2, directed by Brett Ratner, starring Jackie Chan and Chris Tucker – (US/Hong Kong)

S
 The Safety of Objects, starring Joshua Jackson, Dermot Mulroney, Moira Kelly, Patricia Clarkson and Glenn Close
 Samsara – (Tibet/India)
 Save the Last Dance, starring Julia Stiles and Sean Patrick Thomas
 Saving Silverman, starring Jason Biggs, Jack Black and Amanda Peet
 Say It Isn't So, starring Heather Graham, Chris Klein, Sally Field
 Say Yes (세이 예스) – (South Korea)
 Scary Movie 2, starring Shawn Wayans, Marlon Wayans, Anna Faris, Tori Spelling, David Cross and James Woods
 The Score, directed by Frank Oz, starring Robert De Niro, Edward Norton, Angela Bassett and Marlon Brando
 Scotland, PA
 Scratch
 Secret Ballot (Ra'ye makhfi) – (Iran)
 See Spot Run, starring David Arquette – (Canada)
 Serendipity, starring John Cusack and Kate Beckinsale
 Session 9, starring David Caruso and Peter Mullan
 Shallow Hal, directed by the Farrelly brothers, starring Jack Black, Jason Alexander and Gwyneth Paltrow
 Shaolin Soccer (Siu lam juk kau) directed by and starring Stephen Chow – (Hong Kong)
 She Creature, starring Rufus Sewell and Carla Gugino
 The Shipment, starring Matthew Modine – (Canada)
 The Shipping News, directed by Lasse Hallström, starring Kevin Spacey, Judi Dench, Julianne Moore and Cate Blanchett
 Shrek, with the voices of Mike Myers, Eddie Murphy, Cameron Diaz and John Lithgow
 Sia, the Dream of the Python (Sia, le rêve du python) – (Burkina Faso)
 Sidewalks of New York, directed by and starring Edward Burns, with Rosario Dawson, Heather Graham, Dennis Farina
 Sisters (Syostry) – (Russia)
 Slogans (Parullat) – (Albania)
 Sobibór, October 14, 1943, 4 p.m. (Sobibór, 14 octobre 1943, 16 heures) – (France)
 Someone Like You, directed by Tony Goldwyn, starring Ashley Judd, Hugh Jackman, Greg Kinnear
 Son of the Bride (El hijo de la novia) – (Argentina)
 The Son's Room (La stanza del figlio) directed by and starring Nanni Moretti – (Italy)
 Sorum – (South Korea)
 Southern Comfort
 Southlander, starring Rory Cochrane, Beck, Beth Orton
 La Spagnola – (Australia)
 Spirited Away (Sen to Chihiro no Kamikakushi) directed by Hayao Miyazaki – (Japan)
 Spy Game, directed by Tony Scott, starring Robert Redford and Brad Pitt
 Spy Kids, directed by Robert Rodriguez, starring Carla Gugino, Antonio Banderas and Alan Cumming
 Storytelling, directed by Todd Solondz, starring Paul Giamatti, John Goodman, Julie Hagerty, Robert Wisdom and Selma Blair
 Stranger Inside
 Stuck
 Super Troopers
 Sur mes lèvres (Read My Lips), starring Vincent Cassel – (France)
 Sweet November, starring Keanu Reeves and Charlize Theron
 Swordfish, starring Hugh Jackman, Halle Berry, Don Cheadle and John Travolta

T
 The Tailor of Panama, directed by John Boorman, starring Pierce Brosnan, Geoffrey Rush, Jamie Lee Curtis and Brendan Gleeson
 Take Care of My Cat (Goyangireul Butakhae) – (South Korea)
 Tape, directed by Richard Linklater, starring Ethan Hawke, Robert Sean Leonard and Uma Thurman
 Taurus (Telets) – (Russia)
 Ten Days Without Love (El cielo abierto) – (Spain)
 Thirteen Conversations About One Thing, starring Matthew McConaughey, Alan Arkin and John Turturro
 Thirteen Ghosts, starring Tony Shalhoub
 To End All Wars, starring Robert Carlyle and Kiefer Sutherland
 To the Left of the Father (Lavoura Arcaica) – (Brazil)
 Tomcats, starring Jerry O'Connell and Shannon Elizabeth
 Tomorrow (Domani) – (Italy)
 Tortilla Soup, starring Héctor Elizondo, Elizabeth Peña and Raquel Welch
 Town & Country, starring Warren Beatty, Diane Keaton, Goldie Hawn, Garry Shandling, Andie MacDowell and Charlton Heston
 Training Day, starring Denzel Washington and Ethan Hawke
 Treed Murray – (Canada)
 The Tunnel (Der Tunnel) – (Germany)
 Two Can Play That Game, starring Vivica A. Fox and Morris Chestnut

U
 Ultraman Cosmos: The First Contact (ウルトラマンコスモス) – (Japan)
 Unfair Competition (Concorrenza sleale), directed by Ettore Scola – (Italy)
 The Ultimate Warrior (Musa) – (South Korea)
 Undercover Kitty (aka Minoes) – (Netherlands)
 Uprising, starring Leelee Sobieski, Hank Azaria, David Schwimmer

V
 Va savoir (Who Knows?), directed by Jacques Rivette – (France)
 Valentine, starring Denise Richards and Katherine Heigl
 Vanilla Sky, directed by Cameron Crowe, starring Tom Cruise, Penélope Cruz, Cameron Diaz, Noah Taylor and Kurt Russell
 Vidocq, starring Gérard Depardieu – (France)
 Vizontele, directed by Yılmaz Erdoğan – (Turkey)

W
 Waikiki Brothers (Waikiki beuladeoseu) – (South Korea)
 Waking Life, directed by Richard Linklater
 War Photographer (Photographe de guerre) – (Switzerland)
 Warm Water Under a Red Bridge (Akai Hashi no Shita no Nurui Mizu), directed by Shohei Imamura – (Japan)
 The Warrior (Musa) – (South Korea)
 Wasabi, starring Jean Reno – (France)
 Waterboys (ウォーターボーイズ) – (Japan)
 The Wedding Planner, starring Jennifer Lopez and Matthew McConaughey
 Welcome to Pyongyang Animal Park (어서오세요) – (North Korea)
 West 47th Street
 Wet Hot American Summer, directed by David Wain, starring Janeane Garofalo, Amy Poehler, Paul Rudd, Elizabeth Banks, Bradley Cooper and David Hyde Pierce
 What's the Worst That Could Happen?, starring Danny DeVito and Martin Lawrence
 What Time Is It There? (Ni na bian ji dian) – (Taiwan)
 When Strangers Appear – (Australia/New Zealand/US)
 Whispering Sands (Pasir Berbisik) – (Indonesia)
 The Wild Bees (Divoké včely) – (Czech Republic)
 Wild Iris, directed by Daniel Petrie, starring Laura Linney, Gena Rowlands, Emile Hirsch, Fred Ward
 Wit, directed by Mike Nichols, starring Emma Thompson and Christopher Lloyd
 The Words of My Father (Le parole di mio padre) – (Italy)

X-Z
 O Xangô de Baker Street (A Samba for Sherlock) – (Brazil)
 Yamakasi (aka Yamakasi – Les samouraïs des temps modernes) – (France)
 Y Tu Mamá También (And your mum too), directed by Alfonso Cuarón, starring Diego Luna, Gael García Bernal and Maribel Verdú – (Mexico)
 Yellow Asphalt (Asfalt Tzahov) – (Israel)
 Yellow Hair 2 (Norang Meori 2) – (South Korea)
 Yolngu Boy – (Australia)
 Zoolander, directed by and starring Ben Stiller, with Owen Wilson, Will Ferrell and Christine Taylor

Births
 January 5 - Angourie Rice, Australian actress
 February 15 - Haley Tju, American actress
 February 19 - David Mazouz, American actor
 February 24 - Ramona Marquez, English actress
 May 3 - Rachel Zegler, American actress
 May 23 - Matt Lintz, American actor
 June 1 - Ed Oxenbould, Australian actor
 June 9 - Xolo Maridueña, American actor
 June 16 - William Sorenson, Canadian Representative
 June 21 - Eleanor Worthington Cox, English actress
 July 10 - Isabela Merced, American actress
 July 22 - Alisha Newton, Canadian actress
 August 5 - Josie Totah, American actress
 August 6 - Ty Simpkins, American actor
 August 21 - Harry Gilby, English actor
 August 31 - Garrett Wareing, American actor 
 August 31- Corey Maison Transgender actress activist 
 September 6 - Freya Allan, English actress
 September 15 - Emma Fuhrmann, American actress
 October 5 - Dalila Bela, Canadian actress
 October 9 - Louis Hynes, English actor
 October 10 - Blake Cooper, American actor
 October 12 - Raymond Ochoa, American actor and musician
 October 13 - Caleb McLaughlin, American actor
 October 14 - Rowan Blanchard, American actress
 December 13 - Harley Bird, English actress
 December 14 - Joshua Rush, American actor
 December 28 - Maitreyi Ramakrishnan - Canadian actress

Deaths

Film debuts 
Ike Barinholtz – Down
Ty Burrell - Evolution
Henry Cavill – Laguna
Justin Chatwin - Josie and the Pussycats
Bradley Cooper - Wet Hot American Summer
Dominic Cooper - From Hell
Dakota Fanning - Tomcats
Elle Fanning - I Am Sam
Kyle Gallner - Wet Hot American Summer
Tyrese Gibson - Baby Boy
Tom Hardy - Black Hawk Down
Naomie Harris - Crust
Anne Hathaway - The Princess Diaries
Jay Hernandez - Crazy/Beautiful
Freddie Highmore - Women Talking Dirty
Dwayne Johnson - The Mummy Returns
Jaime King – Happy Campers
Scoot McNairy - Wrong Numbers
Sienna Miller - South Kensington
Michelle Monaghan - Perfume
Eric Christian Olsen - Pearl Harbor
David Oyelowo - Dog Eat Dog
Daniel Radcliffe - The Tailor of Panama
Emma Roberts - Blow
Seth Rogen - Donnie Darko
Kristen Schaal - Kate & Leopold
Rafe Spall - Beginner's Luck
Omar Sy – La Tour Montparnasse Infernale
Wilmer Valderrama - Summer Catch

References 

 
Film by year